Pakistan and Afghanistan share a regional sporting rivalry that extends into various sports, especially cricket and football. The rivalry is attributed to the historical, cultural and political relationship between the two neighbouring countries.

History
In Afghanistan, sporting contests against Pakistan are followed intensely. The rivalry, stemming from geopolitical and cultural ties between the two states, has been compared in some aspects to the more longstanding, traditional archrivalry between India and Pakistan in sports.

The two countries share a long and porous international border dating back to the 19th century, with a history of immigration and economic relations. People on both sides of the border, primarily the Pashtuns, share ethnic and cultural ties. However, at a political level, relations between both governments in the past have often been characterised as frosty, thus paving the way for a competitive rivalry in sporting encounters in recent times.

Olympics
Afghanistan made its first appearance at the Summer Olympics in 1936, while Pakistan's first appearance was in 1948. Pakistan have won ten Olympic medals since 1956, including three golds. Afghanistan have won two bronze medals, in 2008 and 2012, with The Guardian reporting that there was "elation that Afghanistan had bettered" their medal tally against Pakistan in the 2012 games.

As of the 2020 Summer Olympics:

Head to head
Pakistani and Afghan athletes have only directly competed against each other at the Olympics in men's wrestling events. In 1960, Pakistan's Muhammad Akhtar defeated Afghanistan's Mohammad Ebrahim Khedri in the first round of the freestyle featherweight category by 4–0. In the freestyle middleweight category, Pakistan's Faiz Muhammad beat Afghanistan's Mohammad Asif Kohkan in the third round by 3–1. In the freestyle heavyweight category, Pakistan's Muhammad Nazir also won against Afghanistan's Nizamuddin Subhani in the second round by 3–1.

In 1972, Pakistan's Muhammad Yaghoub and Afghanistan's Shakar Khan Shakar drew in the second round of the freestyle 74 kg event.

Cricket

History
Cricket in Afghanistan was popularised by Afghan expatriates who learnt the sport while living in Pakistan in the 1980s and 1990s, during the post-Soviet invasion era. Most members of the early Afghan national cricket team grew up in northwest Pakistan and participated in the country's domestic cricket structure, making use of cricket facilities in Peshawar with the support of the Pakistan Cricket Board (PCB). It was during this time that the Afghanistan Cricket Federation (now ACB) was also founded, in 1995. The ACF received recognition from the International Cricket Council (ICC) in 2001.

Several future cricketers representing Afghanistan emerged from Peshawar's club cricket scene, establishing an Afghan cricket club to compete against other local Pakistani sides in the 1990s. Afghanistan fielded their cricket team in Pakistan's domestic setup for the first time in the 2001–02 season, participating in the second division of the Quaid-e-Azam Trophy where they drew two and lost three of their five games. They returned for the Cornelius Trophy in the 2002–03 season, drawing one and losing three matches. In the 2003–04 season, they made an appearance in the PCB's inter-district tournament in Peshawar, where they registered their lone victory against Swabi, drew twice and lost two matches.

The Afghan national team was coached by former Pakistani cricketers Kabir Khan and Rashid Latif in its initial years. During this period, a number of Afghan international cricketers made appearances for Pakistani domestic outfits in the first-class circuit. In 2010, Afghanistan competed at the Asian Games, a non-ICC T20 event hosted by China, where they defeated a second-string Pakistan side by 22 runs in the semi-finals in what was considered an upset. In May 2011, the Afghan side embarked on a tour of Pakistan to partake in a three-match limited overs series against Pakistan A, where they were whitewashed by the home side 3–0. They followed this up with another tour in September to participate in Pakistan's domestic National T20 Cup in Karachi as the Afghan Cheetahs, but had another poor outing, losing all three of their matches.

On 10 February 2012, Afghanistan played a one-off One Day International (ODI) match against Pakistan at Sharjah, the first ever official game between the two sides and also the first ever ODI between an Affiliate and a Test-playing nation. Billed as a historic occasion for Afghan cricket, the game was won comfortably by Pakistan by seven wickets with 13 overs to spare.

In February 2013, Afghanistan visited Pakistan to play a series of limited-overs matches against the Pakistan A team and some regional sides. They played five one-dayers and a Twenty20 at three venues around the country. They won their first limited overs game against Hyderabad–Karachi by nine wickets, but lost their matches against Bahawalpur–Multan and Faisalabad–Rawalpindi. In their matches against Pakistan A, they were clean sweeped by the Pakistani side 2–0 in the one day series and 1–0 in the T20 series. In March, the PCB and ACB inked a two-year memorandum of understanding allowing Afghanistan to use Pakistan's cricket facilities such as the National Cricket Academy and seek technical assistance for the purpose of further developing Afghan cricket. Later in December that year, Pakistan and Afghanistan faced each other in a one-off T20I in Sharjah, where Pakistan prevailed with a six wicket victory with a ball to spare. Since then, the two sides have clashed in the ODI and T20I formats on multiple occasions.

Pakistan and Afghanistan have produced several closely fought matches over the years, with occasional heated moments.

Summary of results

ICC tournaments
The teams have met on two occasions in ICC tournaments, with Pakistan winning both of these meetings.

ACC tournaments
In Asian Cricket Council (ACC) tournaments, both sides have met on three occasions. Pakistan have won on all three occasions.

List of ODI series

List of T20I series

Records

ODI records
The following are team and individual records in One Day Internationals played between the two sides.

Team

Individual

T20I records
The following are team and individual records in Twenty20 Internationals played between the two sides.

Team

Individual

Football
The national teams of Pakistan and Afghanistan have competed against each other in association football on four occasions in modern history; twice in the SAFF Championship and twice in international friendlies. Pakistan have dominated the match-ups, winning three of these games, while Afghanistan have won one game. Contests against Pakistan generate much enthusiasm amongst Afghan football fans on account of their mutual relations and have been referred to as a "rivalry", although the interest in Pakistan toward the rivalry and for football in general is more muted.

Matches

Summary of results

Rugby
Afghanistan played against Pakistan in men's rugby sevens at the 2018 Asia Games in Jakarta for ninth place. Afghanistan won the match by 15–7, with Omar Slaimankhel and Abdul Bari Gazang scoring double and single tries respectively for Afghanistan, and Khalid Hussain Bhatti scoring a try for Pakistan.

See also

 Afghanistan–Pakistan relations

References

 
International sports rivalries
Sport in Afghanistan
Sports rivalries in Pakistan